Medical education in Philippines is principally offered and developed by accredited and government recognized medical schools in the country.

The Philippine medical schools are graduate schools offering the Doctor of Medicine (M.D.) degree. The M.D. is a four-year and six months professional degree program which qualifies the degree holder to take the licensure exam for medical doctors in the Philippines.

Health professionals are one of the biggest exports of the Philippines and a significant source of tax revenue for the government which subsidises medical education.

Admission to medical schools
Before applying to any medical school, a candidate must earn a bachelor's degree with credits in certain required subjects. The most common pre-medical degrees include biology, psychology, pharmacy, medical technology, biochemistry, microbiology, nursing, radiologic technology and physical therapy.

In addition, a candidate must take the National Medical Admission Test (NMAT), the national entrance exam for all medical schools in the Philippines.

Professional medical degree
The Doctor of Medicine (M.D.) is a four-year professional degree program dealing with medical theories, practices, technologies, and problem solving.

The completion of the degree program with one-year postgraduate internship qualifies a candidate to take the licensure exam for medical doctors in the Philippines.

Philippine medical schools
Medical schools in the country are regulated by the Commission on Higher Education (CHED) of the Philippines, and accredited by the Association of Philippine Medical Colleges.

List of APMC (Accredited Philippine Medical Schools)

There are 38 APMC member schools and colleges as of 2009.

Philippine Physician Licensure Examination
The licensure exams for physicians (board exam for doctors) are administered by the Philippine Board of Medicine, a professional regulatory body under the general control and supervision of the Professional Regulation Commission (PRC) of the Philippines.

Advanced medical studies
After graduation from medical school and passing the board exam for doctors, a Filipino doctor is labelled as a general medical practitioner. He may seek further training by way of graduate programs in medicine (i.e., Master of Public Health, Master of Health Services Administration, etc.), or by way of medical specialization.

Graduate medical programs
Graduate programs are offered in some medical schools in the country and abroad. Candidates usually attend lectures and practical exercises in an academic environment and in laboratory settings. The program may require the presentation and defense of a graduate-level thesis, an independent research project, or supervised professional practice as a final graduation requirement. The entire academic program may last from one year to five years, depending on the requirements of the curriculum; the demands of the institution; and the academic load, availability, and dedication of the individual student.

Medical specialization
Medical specialization usually takes three to six years of residency training in accredited hospitals and clinics, and the taking of diplomate board examinations conducted by a board of medical specialists in a particular field (i.e., Philippine Board of Psychiatry, Philippine Board of Pediatrics, Philippine Board of Surgery, Philippine Specialty Board of Internal Medicine, Philippine Academy of Family Physicians Board of Examiners etc.).
After specialization, the doctor may practice his field of specialty or pursue one to three years of subspecialty training / fellowship such as
A) Pediatrics and internal medicine: cardiology, pulmonology, gastroenterology, endocrinology, infectious disease, oncology etc.
B) Surgery: thoracic and cardiovascular, pediatric, transplant, trauma, minimally invasive, oncology
C) Anesthesiology: pain, cardiovascular
D) OB Gyn: oncology, ultrasound, reproductive endocrinology and infertility
Straight programs for subspecialties are also offered : urology, orthopedics, plastic and reconstructive, neurosurgery

Medical practice
The Philippine Medical Association (PMA), is the largest organization of medical doctors in the country. Other medical and health societies co-exist to pursue more specific interests in the medical field (i.e. Philippine Academy of Family Physicians, Philippine Dermatological Society, Philippine Cancer Society, Philippine Pediatric Society, Philippine Association for the Study of Overweight and Obesity, etc.).

The Department of Health, a cabinet-level department under the Office of the President of the Philippines, exercises general monitoring supervisory powers over medical practitioners and allied health personnel in the Philippines.

Notable Filipino doctors
José Rizal - the National Hero of the Philippines
Mariano Ponce - Filipino propagandist, was managing editor of La Solidaridad
Jose Fabella - first Health Secretary
Juan Flavier - former Health Secretary and Senator of the Philippines
Ramon Gustilo - Orthopedic surgeon; responsible for the commonly used Gustilo open fracture classification.
Fe del Mundo - First Filipino woman and female medical student to enter the Harvard Medical School. A pioneer of Pediatrics in the Philippines.
Willie Ong - cardiologist and internist with large social media following, gives free medical advice online

See also
List of medical schools in the Philippines
Higher education in the Philippines
Philippine College of Physicians

References

 
Higher education in the Philippines